is a Japanese Politician who is currently serving as Governor of Aomori Prefecture since June 29, 2003. He previously served as a member of House of Representatives from June 2000 to June 2003 from Aomori 2nd ward. He also served as a Mayor of his hometown Momoishi, Aomori from the year 1992 to 1996.

References

External links 
  in Japanese.

1956 births
Living people
People from Aomori Prefecture
University of Tokyo alumni
Mayors of places in Japan
Members of the House of Representatives (Japan)
Governors of Aomori Prefecture

Politicians from Aomori Prefecture